Barauni Assembly constituency was an assembly constituency in Begusarai district in the Indian state of Bihar.

As a consequence of the orders of the Delimitation Commission of India, Ballia Assembly constituency ceased to exist in 2010. It is now renamed as Teghra Teghra Assembly constituency.

It was part of Balia Lok Sabha constituency.

Results

1977-2005
In the October 2005 Bihar Assembly elections, Rajendra Prasad Singh of CPI won the Barauni seat defeating his nearest rival Surendra Mehta of BJP. Contests in most years were multi cornered but only winners and runners are being mentioned. Rajendra Prasad Singh of CPI defeated Pradip Rai of LJP in February 2005, Ram Lakhan Singh of BJP in 2000 and 1995. Shivdani Singh of CPI defeated Kamla Devi of Congress in 1990. Shakuntala Sinha of CPI defeated Kamla Devi of Congress in 1985. Rameshwar Singh of CPI defeated Sidhweshar Prasad Singh of Congress (I) in 1980. Suryanarayan Singh of CPI defeated Kapil Dev Singh of Janata Party in 1977.

References

Former assembly constituencies of Bihar
Politics of Begusarai district
Barauni